Aster spathulifolius (/haeguk, known in English as seashore spatulate aster) is a native Korean flowering plant that grows on seashores. Due to its short height and thick leaves, haeguk endures strong wind and coldness. It produces purple flowers in sunny spots between rocks, in July through November. Haeguk grows only in Korea and Japan. It originated in Ulleungdo and Liancourt Rocks, two islands in the Sea of Japan. In fall, haeguks are in full bloom, coloring Liancourt Rocks in purple.

References

spathulifolius
Liancourt Rocks